Antoine Tisné (29 July 1932 – 19 July 1998) was a French composer.

Life 
Born in Lourdes, Tisné began his musical studies at the Tarbes Conservatory. He entered the Conservatoire de Paris in 1952 in a music writing class.

He was then a student of Georges Hugon in harmony and Noël Gallon and Jean Rivier in fugue and counterpoint, then had Darius Milhaud and André Jolivet as his teachers. He won a Second Grand Prix de Rome in 1962.

Principal music inspector at the Ministry of Cultural Affairs between 1967 and 1992, then music inspector in charge of the municipal conservatories of the City of Paris, Tisné composed more than three hundred works ranging from pieces for solo instrument to the symphony orchestra. His works are recorded in France by MFA, REM, Calliope. He was an Officer of the National Order of Merit, a Commandeur of the Ordre des Arts et des Lettres and was decorated with the Ordre des Palmes académiques.

Among other awards, he has received the Copley Foundation Prize, the Helphen Prize, the Lili Boulanger Prize, the Koussevitsky Foundation Prize, the Casa de Velázquez Prize, the Grand Prix musical de la Ville de Paris, the Composers' Prize of the SACEM.

Tisné's work is that of a humanist for whom composition procedures are only a tool intended to restore as well as possible the explorations of his imagination without ever being in itself the essential generator of the composed works. New technologies, while he knew how to appreciate them, do not fit into his thought pattern as a deliberate substitute for inspiration or as an alternative to a musical discourse that he likes to be imbued with spirituality. Tisné's work is resolutely expressive and does not need to be followed, at the time of its interpretation, by explanatory comments.

One enters the universe of Tisné as on enters the universe of a painter or even more perhaps in the universe of an architect by its spatial dimension and by its quasi-telluric energy. Tisné was a musician of spaces. These spaces or fields ignore emptiness; they are spiritually, emotionally, historically charged, whether real or purely dreamlike, if only because on can define in this abundance the solution of continuity between the real and the unreal. But his world is also our world.

Tisné died in Paris in 1998.

Works 
 Sonata for piano (1968)
 Épigraphe pour une stèle for piano (1968)
 Soliloques for bassoon solo (1968)
 Concerto for flute and string orchestra (1969)
 Hommage à Calder (1970)
 Stabile Mobile (1970)
 Luminescences for organ (1970)
 Solstices for bassoon and string orchestra (1973)
 Sonata for violin and piano (1973)
 Alliages (1974)
 Osiriaques (1975)
 Héraldiques for trumpet and piano (1975)
 Music for Stonehenge for alto saxophone and piano (1977)
 Espaces irradiés for alto saxophone and piano (1983)
 Bucéphale for 2 pianos and narrator (1984)
 Musique en trio for violin, cello and piano (1984)
 Après... for clarinet (1984)
 Concerto for viola and orchestra (1985)
 Ombra Veneziana for 2 guitars (1985)
 Soleils Noirs for piano (1986)
 Espaces irradiés (1987)
 Antienne pour l'au-delà : Baryton, violon solo et orchestre à cordes (1986)
 Horizons for clarinet and viola (1987)
 Vision des temps immémoriaux (1987)
 Trio pour Ondes Martenot Piano Percussion
 Ragas - Hommage à René Daumal (1987)
 Trio pour Ondes Martenot Piano Percussion avec récitante (1987)
 Épisodes New-Yorkais for flute, clarinet, violin, cello and piano (1988)
 Monodie IV pour un espace sacré for flute solo  (1989)
 Sonata for viola and piano (1989)
 Partita for flute solo (1990)
 Les Voiles de la nuit, premiered by the Orchestre symphonique français conducted by Laurent Petitgirard (1992)

References

External links 
 
 Discography (Discogs)
 Antoine Tisné (Classical music now)
 Antoine Tisné (Cdmc)
 Antoine Tisné: Soleils noirs (YouTube)

1932 births
People from Lourdes
1998 deaths
French classical composers
French male classical composers
20th-century French composers
French male composers
Prix de Rome for composition
Conservatoire de Paris alumni
Commandeurs of the Ordre des Arts et des Lettres
Officers of the Ordre national du Mérite
20th-century French male musicians